The Love-Larson Opera House is a historic building in Fremont, Nebraska. It was built in 1888 by James Wheeler Love, a former educator, to replace a former theatre demolished in 1887. The new building was designed by architect Francis M. Ellis. It was dedicated on December 14, 1888 with a performance by actress Minnie Maddern Fiske. Upon its purchase by L.P. Larson in 1905, it was renamed the L.P. Larson Opera House. It has been listed on the National Register of Historic Places since September 10, 1974.

References

National Register of Historic Places in Dodge County, Nebraska
Buildings and structures completed in 1888